The 1951 NCAA Swimming and Diving Championships were contested in March 1951 at the pool at Gregory Gymnasium at the University of Texas at Austin in Austin, Texas at the 15th annual NCAA-sanctioned swim meet to determine the team and individual national champions of men's collegiate swimming and diving in the United States. 

Yale finished on top of the team standings, earning the Bulldogs' their third national title.

Team standings
Note: Top 10 only
(H) = Hosts
Full results

See also
List of college swimming and diving teams

References

NCAA Division I Men's Swimming and Diving Championships
NCAA Swimming And Diving Championships
NCAA Swimming And Diving Championships
NCAA Swimming And Diving Championships